Marie Anne Adelaide Lenormand (1772–1843), also known as Marie Anne Le Normand, was a French bookseller, necromancer, fortune-teller and cartomancer of considerable fame during the Napoleonic era. In France, Lenormand is considered as the greatest cartomancer of all time, highly influential on the wave of French cartomancy that began in the late 18th century.

Early life 
Lenormand was born on 27 May 1772 in Alençon, Normandy, to Jean Louis Antoine Lenormand, a draper, and Marie Anne Lenormand (née Gilbert). Lenormand was orphaned at the age of five and educated in a convent school. Lenormand left Alençon for Paris in 1786.

Career

Lenormand claimed to have given cartomantic advice to many famous persons, among them leaders of the French Revolution (Marat, Robespierre and St-Just), Empress Josephine and Tsar Alexander I. She was active for more than 40 years.

In 1814 Lenormand started a second literary career and published many texts, causing many public controversies. She  was imprisoned more than once, though never for very long.

Death 

Lenormand died in Paris on 25 June 1843 and is buried in Division 3 of Père Lachaise Cemetery. She left behind a fortune of 500,000 Francs, and left no heirs other than a nephew who, at the time of her death, was in the army. A devout Catholic, her nephew burned all of her occult paraphernalia, taking only the monetary fortune that she left behind.

Works 
 Les souvenirs prophétiques d'une sibylle sur les causes secrétes de son arrestation - Paris (1814) (592 pages)
 Anniversaire de la mort de l'impératrice Josephine (1815)
 La sibylle au tombeau de Louis XVI (1816)
 Les oracles sibyllins ou la suite des souvenirs prophétiques - Paris (1817) (528 pages)
 La sibylle au congrès d'Aix-la-Chapelle (1819) (316 pages)
 Mémoires historiques et secrets de l'impératrice Joséphine, Marie-Rose Tascher-de-la-Pagerie, première épouse de Napoléon Bonaparte - Paris (1820) (556 pages)
 Mémoire justificatif présenté par Mlle Le Normand (1821) (20 pages)
 Cri de l'honneur (1821) (18 pages)
 Souvenirs de la Belgique - Cent jours d'infortunes où le procès mémorable (1822) (416 pages)
 L'ange protecteur de la France au tombeau de Louis XVIII (1824)
 L'ombre immortelle de Catherine II au tombeau d'Alexandre Ier (1826)
 L'ombre de Henri IV au palais d'Orléans (1830) (107 pages)
 Le petit homme rouge au château des Tuileries - Paris (1831) (107 pages)
 Manifeste des dieux sur les affaires de France (1832) (60 pages)
 Arrêt suprême des dieux de l'Olympe en faveur de Mme. la duchesse de Berry et de son fils (1833) (144 pages)

Possibly author of
 Histoire de Jean VI. de Portugal, depuis sa naissance jusqu'à sa mort en 1826. - Paris : Ponthieu, 1827

Lenormand cards 

After Lenormand's death her name was used on several cartomancy decks. This included a deck of 36 illustrated cards known as the Petit Lenormand, or simply "Lenormand cards", still used extensively today. It is commonly used for divination in France, the Low Countries, Central Europe, the Balkans, and Russia. It eventually spread to Brazil, probably through European and Russian emigres.

Das Spiel der Hoffnung
The 36-card Petite Lenormand tarot deck is modelled on a deck of cards published circa 1799 called Das Spiel der Hoffnung (The Game of Hope), a game of chance designed by Johann Kaspar Hechtel of Nuremberg. It was originally meant to be laid out in a 6 x 6 grid of cards and played as a boardgame, with #1 (The Rider) as the start and #35 (The Anchor / Hope) as the end. Movement was determined with a pair of standard six-sided dice. Some cards granted money from the pot or moved the player forward to another card. Others forced the player to pay into the pot or moved them backwards. If the player landed on #8 (The Coffin) or overshot #35 by 1 and ended up on #36 (The Cross) instead, they were stuck there. They couldn't get out until they either rolled a double number on a later turn (like two "1s" or two "6s") or another player landed on the card. If the player rolled too high and overshot #36, they deducted the number of spaces to #36 from the result and then moved backwards for the remainder (for example, a player who was on #32 rolls a result of 8, they subtract 4 from the result [36 - 32 = 4] and then go backwards four spaces to #28 [32 - 4 = 28]).

It also had German- and/or French-style playing cards depicted on them in the upper field so it could double as a standard German 36-card deck. If used as a card deck, the numbered cards in each suit ranged from 6 to 9, followed by the Panier (or "banner", representing the 10 card), the three Face Cards (Untermann (Jack), Obermann (Queen) and König (King)), and the Daus (or "Deuce", representing the 2) replacing the Ace.

Divination is carried out by either laying out a spread or a grid of cards. A spread is usually of 3 or 5 cards laid out left to right. A grid is usually of three cards in three rows (3x3). The topic of the spread is the center card on the second row and the other cards are interpreted in how they relate to or influence it. There is also the Grande Tableau ("Great Scene"), in which the whole deck is laid out in a grid of four rows of nine cards (4x9) or five rows (four rows of eight cards and the fifth row having only four cards). The reader interprets the pattern to see how all the cards are connected to the topic or person the reading is for (the Querant). 

Some modern Lenormand decks have additional or alternative #29 (Male) and #28 (Female) cards for non-heterosexual or gender fluid people in the Querant's life.

In popular culture 
Lenormand appears as a character in the video game Assassin's Creed Unity.

Lenormand's reincarnated soul is a character in the novel Waiting for Gertrude: A Graveyard Gothic by Bill Richardson.

Lenormand is the subject of a séance in the first episode of the Russian TV series Detective Anna.

References

External links
 Trionfi: Biography of Marie Anne Adelaide Lenormand by autorbis
 Trionfi Museum: Fortune telling decks including Lenormand decks
 Lenormand Museum: Online museum displaying a private collection of Lenormand decks
 Remarkable women of different nations and ages: Mademoiselle Lenormand; the Fortune Teller (John P. Jewett and Company, Boston 1858)
 The Court of Napoleon by Frank Boott Goodrich (Derby and Jackson, New York 1858)
 Madame Lenormand, the most famous card reader of all time by Mary K. Greer
 Origins of Playing Card Divination by Mary K. Greer

1772 births
1843 deaths
French occultists
Cartomancy
People from Alençon
Burials at Père Lachaise Cemetery
19th-century occultists
Fortune tellers
19th-century French memoirists